Farvartish Rezvaniyeh (born on March 25, 1984, in Tehran, Iran) is an Iranian video journalist, writer, and satirist.

Life 
Rezvaniyeh has studied music, cinema, and graphic design in various art schools and holds a bachelor's degree in dramatic literature.

He began journalism in his teenage years, and his articles have been published in the most prominent Iranian newspapers such as Shargh, Ham-Mihan, and Hamshahri. Rezvaniyeh was a member of the editorial board of Gol-Agha Weekly, the most famous satirical magazine in Iran after the 1979 revolution, which worked with the greatest Iranian satirists.

Works 

The action-comedy stories written by Farvartish and published in newspapers have been viral. He has also invented a method, named "Boomerang," in Persian fiction. In this writing style, the main character of the story is the reader, and one can imagine themselves in the settings described by the writer by reading the story.

In 2005, Farvartish published what later became the most well-known April Fool's hoax in the Persian language, which claimed that the Milad communications tower in Tehran had started leaning. Millions of Iranians believed this lie, and even a large number of people gathered at the tower's location to witness its collapse. Also, the price of real estate in the vicinity of the tower fell.

Farvartish has so far published three books, named Boomerang, Sept. 12, and Tehran Dominos. Tehran Dominos is an action story narrating the circumstances of Tehran after a severe earthquake. An endorsement by Bahram Akasheh, a prominent Iranian seismologist, is written on the book's back cover recommending it to everyone living in Tehran. This book is not suitable for persons with cardiovascular or neurological conditions.

References

External links 
 
 

Living people
People from Tehran
Iranian activists
Iranian satirists
Islamic Azad University alumni
1984 births